Huang Yan (August 16, 1912 – June 9, 1989) was a People's Republic of China politician. He was born in Liu'an County, Anhui Province (modern Yu'an District, Lu'an, Anhui Province). He was the second governor of his home province under the People's Republic of China.

1912 births
1989 deaths
People's Republic of China politicians from Anhui
Chinese Communist Party politicians from Anhui
Governors of Anhui
Politicians from Lu'an